Choctawhatchee High School is a high school in Fort Walton Beach, Florida. It is the only school in Okaloosa County to offer the International Baccalaureate Diploma Programme. It also offers the Advanced Placement Program and honors classes, AFJROTC, a dual-enrollment aviation program offered by Embry-Riddle Aeronautical University, and pre-engineering classes (offered by the University of West Florida). Its newest innovation is the Information Technology Institute housing the Academy of Web Design as well as the Academy of Digital Design. Choctaw has received Florida's highest rating of A+ for many years.

History 

Choctawhatchee originally opened its doors in Shalimar, Florida, on September 22, 1952. It was filled over its capacity of 500 students, enrolling 625 students in grades 7 through 12. The local news held a contest to name the school, and thus Choctawhatchee, or "coming together," was picked. Later it was relocated to its current location in Fort Walton Beach, Florida with the old site becoming what is now Meigs Middle School.

Extracurriculars

Cheerleading 

The cheerleaders were back-to-back National Champions for 2004–05 and 2005–06 and 2007–08, as well as being Florida's 7-time Defending State Champion. They also won the state championship in their division for the 2016-2017 school year.

Football 

In 1990, the football team was the 5A State Champion.

Basketball 

The girls and boys basketball teams were both state runner ups for the 2017-2018 school year and made it to the Road to State for many of the years before that.

Volleyball 

The volleyball team were the state champions fin 2017-18.

Flag football 

Choctaw's flag football team made it to State Final Four inn the 2016-2017 school year.

Band and Stylemarchers 

The school's marching band, known as the Style Marchers, were back-to-back 5A Florida State Champions in 2004–05, 2005–06, and were runners-up for 2006–07. The Stylemarchers came back on top for another back-to-back 5A Florida State Championship for 2007–08, 2008–09. The Choctawhatchee Style Marchers also marched at the 2009 Macy's Thanksgiving Day Parade in N.Y. The choral and band departments annually send students to All-State and make superiors at their respective district festivals. The drumline at Choctaw has been best in the state of Florida, next to Chamberlain High School (with a score of 98 in 2006 and 97.5 in 2007), in 2004, 2005, and 2006. The winter percussion ensemble has placed in the top 13 at the WGI World Championships since 1998. The drumline won 1st in she Scholastic Open competition in 2002 and were promoted to Scholastic World for the following year. In 2003, they placed 3rd, in 2004 they placed 12th, in 2005, 8th in 2006, 6th, and in 2007 &2008 they placed 4th in the Scholastic World Division. In 2019, the Drumline returned to Dayton, Ohio for the first time since 2013, placing 14th in finals. The Winter Color Guard has also been a finalist for many years at the WGI World Championships, including 2007, 2006, 2004, 2003. In 2014 the Winter Guard was awarded 13th in world class at WGI World Championships.

Film and Production 

WBGI members make a news show daily and produce many other promotional videos for the school. In 2018, WBGI made a spirit video that won Choctaw the Sunshine State Showdown.

Newspaper 

The school newspaper, Smoke Signals, won a top award from the Florida Scholastic Press Association in 1998.

Yearbook 

The Tomahawk Yearbook has won numerous state and national awards.

Extracurricular Groups

Honor Clubs 
Spanish, French, Music, Art, and Science Honor, as well as National Honor Society, Beta Club, International Thespian Society, Mu Alpha Theta, and Academic Team.

Service Clubs 
Key Club, Wheelettes, and Interact.

Special Interest Clubs 
Future Educators of America, War Chiefs, Step Team, SADD, Smoke Signals student newspaper, Wordsmiths, Minority Council, Political Theory, Pi Club, Book Club, Bowling Club, SOUL, Aviation Club, Anime Club, Ultimate Frisbee Club, Fellowship of Christian Athletes, Movie Club, and the Technology Club, Stylemarchers, and ping pong club.

AFJROTC
Choctaw is also home to the AFJROTC group FL-22. They participate in community events, like the service clubs. They posted the colors at home game and at the homecoming game they also provide a sabre team to arc for the homecoming court.

Traditions 

At the beginning of each home football game, the school Indian, or student mascot, rides a horse across the field and throws a spear midfield. Although many think that the idea was borrowed from Florida State University, in fact it is opposite that, as accounted for by the former football coach and athletic director, Wyman Townsel. Ann Bowden, wife of Florida State University football coach, Bobby Bowden, attended a Choctaw football game in the 1970s, saw the horse run, and told her husband that it would be a good idea for FSU.

In front of the school stands three totem poles just outside the front office. They are a symbol of school pride and represents various aspects of student life and have withstood hurricanes, attacks by rivals, and continue to serve as an emblem of the Choctaw High School family.

Also in front of the school are engraved bricks, purchased by students and then engraved so that they may forever be a part of the school.

The Alma Mater was written during the school's first year by the band director, Jim Leonard. The tune is a World War I song, "Long, Long Trail Awinding." In 1956, Bryan Lindsey came to Choctaw as choral director, and began writing words to "Big Green Indian." Lindsey collaborated with Leonard to compose the song. It became the school's fight song.

Choctaw is home to many school-spirited students, none more so than the Teepee Crew and the Warchiefs. The Teepee Crew consists of upperclassmen males who send smoke through the teepee, which is located just past the endzone, whenever the football team scores  a touchdown. The Warchiefs is a group of highly motivated, spirited students who attend all of the football and basketball games and cheer along with the cheerleaders.

References

External links 
 Official Choctawhatchee Senior High School site
 Choctawhatchee StyleMarcher Band site
 Choctawhatchee Football site

High schools in Okaloosa County, Florida
Educational institutions established in 1952
Public high schools in Florida
Okaloosa County School District
Education in Okaloosa County, Florida
1952 establishments in Florida